The 2015 CONCACAF Gold Cup Final decided the winners of the 2015 CONCACAF Gold Cup. It was held on July 26, 2015, at Lincoln Financial Field in Philadelphia, and contested by Jamaica and Mexico. It was Jamaica's first final of a CONCACAF championship, and Mexico's 12th; they won a record 10th with a 3–1 victory. It was also the first Gold Cup Final since 2003 not to feature the United States.

Mexico advanced to a one-match play-off, which was held on October 10, 2015, against the 2013 CONCACAF Gold Cup winners, the United States, for the opportunity to represent CONCACAF in the 2017 FIFA Confederations Cup in Russia.

Route to the final

Match details

Notes

References

External links
CONCACAF Gold Cup , CONCACAF.com

Final
CONCACAF Gold Cup finals
Jamaica national football team matches
Mexico national football team matches
CONCACAF Gold Cup Final
CONCACAF Gold Cup Final
CONCACAF Gold Cup Final
Sports competitions in Philadelphia
CONCACAF Gold Cup Final
CONCACAF Gold Cup Final
Soccer in Pennsylvania
South Philadelphia